Santurantikuy (Quechua santu saint (a borrowing from Spanish santo), rantikuy to buy something only for oneself, "to buy oneself a saint") is a craft fair held annually on December 24 in the central square of the city of Cusco in Peru. The National Institute of Culture declared the event a National Cultural Heritage by Resolución Directoral National No. 1406/INC-2009.

See also 
 Warachikuy

References 

Cusco
Christmas markets
Tourist attractions in Cusco Region